Eupithecia innotata, the angle-barred pug, is a moth of the family Geometridae. The species was first described by Johann Siegfried Hufnagel in 1767. It ranges from Spain in the west to western Siberia and Central Asia in the east.

There are three forms found in the British Isles:
 E. innotata sensu stricto (angle-barred pug) is found only on the east and south-east coasts
 f. fraxinata (ash pug) is widely distributed
 rare f. tamarisciata (tamarisk pug)

The forewings are generally dark brown or grey with few distinguishing marks apart from a small white tornal spot which may not be present on the frequent melanic forms. The wingspan is 18–24 mm. Two broods are produced each year with the adults flying in May and June and again in August. Moths of the spring brood are usually darker in colour than the later specimens.
The larva is bright yellow-brown with brown and greenish markings, most strikingly a variety of large, brown-green spots along the back. It has numerous, small white warts all over the body.

The caterpillars of the three races have different food plants:
 f. fraxinata feeding on ash
 E. innotata sensu stricto feeding on sea-buckthorn
 f. tamarisciata is found on the alien food plant tamarisk

The species overwinters as a pupa.

References 

Chinery, Michael (1986, reprinted 1991). Collins Guide to the Insects of Britain and Western Europe.
Skinner, Bernard (1984). The Colour Identification Guide to Moths of the British Isles.
Waring, Paul; Townsend, Martin & Lewington, Richard  (2003) Field Guide to the Moths of Great Britain and Ireland. British Wildlife Publishing, Hook, UK. .

External links

Lepiforum e.V.

innotata
Moths of Asia
Moths of Europe
Moths described in 1767
Taxa named by Johann Siegfried Hufnagel